Upper Loughor was an electoral ward in the City and County of Swansea, Wales.  The ward covered the eastern part of the town of Loughor in the parliamentary constituency of Gower.

It was bounded by Lower Loughor and the Loughor estuary to the west; Penyrheol to the north; Kingsbridge to the east and Gowerton to the south.

In the 2008 local council elections, the turnout for Upper Loughor was 42.69%.  The results were:

References

Former electoral wards of Swansea